Ghosts  is a British sitcom first broadcast on BBC One in April 2019. The series follows a collection of ghosts from different historical periods haunting a country house while sharing the house with its new living occupants. The series is written and performed by many of the cast members of Horrible Histories and Yonderland. The series also airs on HBO Max in the US and CBC Gem in Canada.

The series is the first post-watershed comedy by the ensemble, although some television critics said that it was suitable for adults and children alike. Reviews of the series have been positive, with critics appreciating the high joke rate, the premise and the strength of the acting ensemble. The series is made by the production company Monumental Pictures, part of ITV Studios. It is filmed on location at West Horsley Place in Surrey.

Premise
Alison Cooper unexpectedly inherits the vast but crumbling Button House from a distant relative. The house is haunted by numerous squabbling ghosts from across the ages who died on its grounds and are invisible and intangible to the living. Ignoring their solicitor's advice to sell the property, Alison and her husband Mike decide to move in and renovate it, with the idea of turning the house into a luxury hotel.

At first, the ghosts are not very happy with the living couple's plans and conspire to get rid of the newcomers. After various failed attempts to scare them, one of the ghosts pushes Alison from an upstairs window, resulting in her being clinically dead for three minutes. When she awakes two weeks later from an induced coma, Alison discovers her husband has arranged a huge mortgage, and that her near-death experience has given her the ability to see and hear ghosts.

Initially believing the ghosts to be an after-effect of her accident, Alison eventually accepts the truth and confronts them. Because the Coopers cannot leave for financial reasons and the ghosts are bound to the mansion's land until they can ascend into the afterlife, both sides eventually agree that they have to coexist as best they can. Meanwhile, the house requires a lot of work, and Alison and Mike devise several schemes to assist their perilous finances.

Cast

Main

Living

 Charlotte Ritchie as Alison Cooper – A young woman who has inherited a mansion from Heather Button, a distant relative of unspecified relation. After a temporarily death-inducing experience caused by Julian pushing her out of a window, she is able to see, hear and interact with ghosts.
 Kiell Smith-Bynoe as Mike Cooper – Alison's husband, who has grand plans for the house but is not very adept at putting them into action. Although at first believing the ghosts to be Alison's hallucinations, Mike comes to accept them and often tries to communicate with them despite being unable to see them.

Ghosts

 Lolly Adefope as Kitty – An excitable, overly chummy, naïve Georgian noblewoman who wishes to be friends with everyone. She has repressed her unhappy memories of her adoptive family, particularly those of her sister.
 Mathew Baynton as Thomas Thorne – A melodramatic and easily infatuated Romantic poet, who was fatally shot in a duel in 1824, orchestrated by his cousin, Francis Button (who married Thomas' own love and whose descendants came to inherit Button House). He falls in love with Alison at first sight despite her being alive, married, and distantly related to him.
 Simon Farnaby as Julian Fawcett MP – The most recently deceased ghost: a disgraced Tory MP who died of a heart attack in a 1993 sex scandal while not wearing trousers. He can physically interact with the corporeal world to a limited degree if he concentrates hard enough, typically with only a forefinger to nudge small objects or press buttons.
 Martha Howe-Douglas as Lady Stephanie 'Fanny' Button – A pompous, overbearing Edwardian lady of the manor and the great-grandmother of Heather Button (therefore related to Alison and Thomas). She was pushed out of a window by her adulterous husband and can be seen in photographs. She unconsciously re-enacts her death every night at 3 AM until Julian alters a clock in the series premiere so that she does so a few hours later, making her scream serve as a morning alarm.
 Jim Howick as Patrick ‘Pat’ Butcher – A friendly and polite leader of a uniformed youth group resembling scouts, who was accidentally shot through the neck with an arrow on the Button House grounds in 1984 by one of the uniformed boys in his care. 
 Laurence Rickard as Rogh/'Robin' – The oldest ghost: a caveman who lived on the land Button House now occupies and died of a lightning strike that hit a tree he was using to hide from a bear. He can manipulate electrical currents (likely due to his lightning-themed death) and enjoys playing chess, which he learnt from Julian, as well as performing ancient rituals for the moon, which he calls 'Moonah'. He can also be heard by living animals. According to the fourth episode of the second series, all the other main characters are distant descendants of his.
Rickard also appears as the head of Sir Humphrey Bone – A Tudor nobleman who accidentally decapitated himself after being mistakenly accused of his wife's plot to assassinate Elizabeth I. He struggles with his body (played by Yani Xander) dropping his head and failing to pick him up.
 Ben Willbond as the Captain – A stern, closeted World War II army officer, who is still obsessed with his time in the war and his rank as an officer. He fancies himself as the de facto leader of the ghosts. In early episodes he devises many of their plans with elements of military strategy, and Pat most frequently defers to his authority.
 Katy Wix as Mary – A kind, occasionally timid, but often outspoken and superstitious Stuart era witch trial victim who was burnt at the stake and smoulders when speaking of, or reminded of the experience. The living can smell burning if she passes through them. She has a gentle flirtation with and closeness to Robin, but ascends into the afterlife in the fourth series.

Recurring
 The plague victim ghosts – An indeterminate number of ghosts who died during the Black Death and whose bodies were buried in a plague pit under the basement. Although they can go upstairs if they wish, they choose to stay in the basement and so are experts on the house's heating system. Eight of them are portrayed by the actors who play the main ghosts.
 Anya McKenna-Bruce as Jemima – A plague victim child ghost who lurks in the pantry and sings ominous nursery rhymes that can be heard by the living and scare people and ghosts.
 Geoff McGivern as Barclay Beg-Chetwynde – Alison and Mike's neighbour with whom they have a land dispute over Button House's access road. He always gets Alison's name wrong; calling her Annabelle.
 Nathan Bryon as Obi – A friend of the Coopers who often appears at their home of Button House for parties.

Guest appearances
 Sophie Thompson as Bunny Beg-Chetwynde – Barclay's alcoholic wife.
 Rosie Cavaliero as Fiona Legge – A hotel developer who attempted to buy Button House as cheaply as possible and con Alison and Mike out of money.
 Ania Marson as Lady Heather Button - The great-granddaughter of Lady Fanny and the last Button of Button House. When she dies in the first episode at the age of 99, Alison Cooper comes to inherit the house. She also appears in a flashback when Julian first becomes a ghost.
 Jackie Clune as Gwen. One of a number of individuals who visit Button House in order to find proof that ghosts are real, after Lady Button appears in a photo which circulates online. Gwen firmly believes that spirits exist.
 Holli Dempsey as Isabelle Higham – The daughter and later owner of Button (previously Higham) house who was in a relationship with Thomas before he died, who then married his cousin Francis, and whose descendants would inherit and live in Button House (including Alison, Lady Fanny and Lady Heather Button).
 Bronwyn James as Sam – Clare's wife.
 Leon Herbert as Errol Cooper – Mike's father.
 Lorna Gayle as Betty Cooper – Mike's mother.
 Timmika Ramsay as Leila – Mike's sister.
 Samantha Pearl as Angela – Mike's sister.
 Sujaya Dasgupta as Zara – A documentary presenter, who visits Button House to produce a show on the Bone Plot.
 Chloé Delanney as Sophie – Humphrey's French wife, who plotted to assassinate Queen Elizabeth I and replace her with Catholic Mary Stuart, but was discovered by the guards and fled, before Humphrey was accidentally beheaded.
 Jennifer Saunders as Lavinia – Fanny's mother, who determinedly planned to marry off her daughter.
 Christopher Villiers as Simeon – Fanny's father who was addicted to gambling.
 Richard Glover as Maddocks – A former Gamekeeper ghost that died after getting his foot stuck in a badger trap.
 Peter Sandys-Clarke as Havers, The Captain's lieutenant and close friend during the war, towards whom he was unable to admit his romantic feelings.
 Bridget Christie as Annie – The ghost of a Puritan woman who previously haunted Button House and was close with Mary, teaching her how to speak her mind, before moving onto the afterlife. She died after choking on a piece of bread.
 Isabella Laughland as Clare – A woman who plans and ultimately has her wedding to partner Sam at Button House.
 Jessica Knappett as Lucy – A suspicious woman who introduces herself as Alison's paternal half-sister, but is really trying to trick her into giving her money.

Production

According to Mathew Baynton, the idea of a haunted house was one of the first ideas the writers developed after the end of Horrible Histories. However, they were initially uncertain because there was "no jeopardy that we could write into it" and they created the sitcom Yonderland for Sky One instead. However, after the ending of that series, they "realised the boredom of eternity and the existential aspects of the ghosts idea was unique...We realised it was a house-share sitcom – and as soon as you stop thinking about those kind of major drama stakes, you unlock a story that is really domestic and petty." Mike and Alison, the two living characters, were introduced as a foil to the ghosts, as well as to introduce "the stakes, the worries about money, life and everything you need for a story".

Writing in Broadcast, Jim Howick notes that the 2016 episode of Who Do You Think You Are?, in which EastEnders actor Danny Dyer discovered he was related to Edward III of England, formed the basis of the idea of Alison: "We loved the idea of Danny Dyer's royal lineage...We've mirrored this with our character Alison, who discovers her aristocratic roots, which she embraces immediately and takes on with relish".

Baynton recalled that BBC head of comedy commissioning Shane Allen was looking for a pre-watershed primetime sitcom for BBC One. During the writing process, the intention was to make an adult show, but one that would appeal to older children, along the lines of Blackadder: "We wanted to do something that has a properly creaky atmosphere. I love the idea that some kids might stay up for it. It's great as a kid when you think something isn't quite for you and it's a bit cheekier." In the event, the programme was scheduled at 9.30 on Monday evenings after the sitcom Not Going Out. Baynton noted in the i newspaper that as the original audience of Horrible Histories would now be grown up, "hopefully we're making something so they can continue to watch us!"

Baynton said the Tim Burton film Beetlejuice provided the writers a "useful tonal reference" as did The Rocky Horror Show. Jim Howick, addressing its similarity to the 1970s series Rentaghost noted most of the writers were either slightly too young or too old to have watched it, but the series did make knowing use of many of the clichés of horror programmes, such as headless Tudor noblemen.

The programme is filmed at West Horsley Place in Surrey, England, a large country house unexpectedly inherited by the writer and former University Challenge presenter Bamber Gascoigne in 2014 from his great aunt, the Duchess of Roxburghe, under circumstances not dissimilar to those depicted in the series. Some scenes were also filmed on London Road and Clandon Road in nearby Guildford with outside images of the famous Bettys Tea Rooms in Harrogate, North Yorkshire rebranded as "Sandrine's" in the penultimate scene of the final episode of series three.

Filming of the second series started on 13 January 2020. It started airing, on BBC One, on 12 September that year. The series was moved to a pre-watershed slot of 8.30pm. Production on the third series began in early 2021 and finished on 7 April 2021. It premiered on 9 August 2021. Filming of the fourth series wrapped on 16 March 2022.

Series 4 of Ghosts was covered in the BBC podcast series Inside…, which is a companion podcast to popular comedy series and offers a deeper, behind the scenes look into each episode via discussions with the writers and cast members. The Ghosts episodes are hosted by Nathan Bryon  who plays Mike and Alison's friend, Obi.
A fifth series, to be broadcast in 2023, was confirmed by the BBC in December 2022.

Episodes

Series 1 (2019)

Series 2 (2020)

Series 3 (2021)

Series 4 (2022)

Reception
Critical reception to the series has been positive. On the review aggregation website Rotten Tomatoes, the first series holds approval rating of 83%, based on 12 reviews, with an average rating of 7.8/10. The website's critical consensus said, "The perfect blend of spooky and silly, Ghosts's ghastly giggles are a delight." The second series received an approval rating of 100%, based on five reviews, with an average rating of 6.7/10. The third series also received a 100% approval rating, but with a higher average rating of 8.7/10, based on six reviews.

Stuart Jeffries in The Guardian wrote that "In making us giggle at the supernatural, Ghosts is very British – a mash-up of Noël Coward's Blithe Spirit and Randall and Hopkirk (Deceased), not to mention the manifold sillinesses of Hammer horror films. But it is American in the sense of having a gag-to-airtime ratio much higher than British sitcoms normally manage these days." Michael Hogan in The Daily Telegraph was similarly positive, comparing it to the 1970s children's sitcom Rentaghost but noting that "This deliriously daft supernatural romp, however, was none the worse for that."

Susannah Butter in the Evening Standard said the first episode reminded her of a property show, watching the couple view a terrible flat, before making their escape to the country. She was critical of the post-watershed scheduling of 9.30pm, saying "it feels like a show that children would enjoy" and noting "This is a gentle ensemble comedy. Alison and Mike are wide-eyed, charming and likeable. I would gladly have them as friends, even though they can't sing...Nothing about this show is scary." Carol Midgley in The Times was also confused by the scheduling, noting that "Ghosts is smut[-] and swearword-free" and calling it "a curiously life-affirming comedy about death".

Contrasting it with the bleak "sadcoms" such as Fleabag and After Life, Pat Stacey in the Irish Independent noted "It's joyously, infectiously silly, yet at the same time whip-smart. It's just the ticket to scare those sadcom blues away."

A second series was announced a week after the transmission of episode 6. The BBC Press Office announcement noted it received a consolidated average of 3.7 million viewers across the series, highlighting its popularity with 16–34 year-old viewers. On 8 October 2019, Rickard confirmed that a third series had also been commissioned.

In April 2021, the sitcom was nominated for the Scripted Comedy BAFTA Award and the Comedy Writer BAFTA Craft Award.

Adaptation 

An American adaptation of the series was announced on 29 November 2019 by CBS. On 4 February 2020, it was announced that a pilot had been ordered to be produced by BBC Studios, Lionsgate Television and CBS Studios. On 4 March 2020, Rose McIver was cast in the pilot. On 1 July 2020, Utkarsh Ambudkar was also cast. On 9 December 2020, additional casting of Brandon Scott Jones, Richie Moriarty, Asher Grodman, Rebecca Wisocky, Sheila Carrasco, Danielle Pinnock and Roman Zaragoza was announced. On 31 March 2021, it was announced that a full series had been ordered. The series premiered on 7 October 2021. On 24 January 2022, the series was renewed for a second season. The second season premiered on 29 September 2022.

References

External links

Inside... (Series 4 companion podcast)

2019 British television series debuts
2010s British sitcoms
2020s British sitcoms
2010s supernatural television series
2020s supernatural television series
BBC television sitcoms
British supernatural television shows
English-language television shows
Fiction about near-death experiences
Television series about ghosts
Television series about marriage
Television shows about psychic powers
Works set in country houses